A crayfish party is a traditional summertime eating and drinking celebration in the Nordic countries. The tradition has also spread to Finland via its Swedish-speaking population, and Norway. A similar tradition exists in the Baltic countries in particular in Lithuania and Latvia.

Crayfish parties are generally held during August, a tradition that began because the crayfish harvest in Sweden was, for most of the 20th century, legally limited to the late summer. Nowadays, the  date in early August has no legal significance. Customary party accessories are novelty paper hats, paper tablecloths, paper lanterns (often depicting the Man in the Moon), and bibs.

The crayfish are boiled in salt water and seasoned with fresh dill – preferably "crown dill" harvested after the plant has flowered – then served cold and eaten with the fingers. Bread, mushroom pies, strong Västerbotten cheese, salads and other dishes are served buffet-style.

Spain
This is because this crustacean has always been part of the traditional gastronomy of the area. Since 2011, the town includes a "Swedish dinner" in its celebrations, during which the residents practice the Swedish tradition of a street dinner with paper lanterns and candles in true -style. For the inaugural Swedish dinner, the festival was honoured by the presence of a special guest, the First Secretary and Chancellor of Spain, Eva Boix.

References

Parties
Swedish culture
Swedish cuisine
Finnish culture
Swedish folklore
Finnish folklore
National dishes
August events